The Journal of Multilingual and Multicultural Development is a peer-reviewed academic journal covering the study of topics in the sociology and social psychology of language, in language and cultural politics, policy, planning, and practice. The editor-in-chief is John Robert Edwards. It was established in 1980 and is published in 7 issues per year by Routledge.

Abstracting and indexing 
The journal is abstracted and indexed in Linguistics and Language Behavior Abstracts, MLA International Bibliography, and Social Sciences Citation Index. According to the Journal Citation Reports, the journal has a 2016 impact factor of 0.943, ranking it 67th of 182 journals in the Linguistics category.

References

External links 
 

Taylor & Francis academic journals
Linguistics journals
Sociolinguistics journals
Publications established in 1980
English-language journals
Multiculturalism
7 times per year journals